George Edwin Alderton (25 August 1854 – 7 March 1942) was a New Zealand newspaper proprietor and editor, orchardist, land agent. He was born in New Malden, Surrey, England on 25 August 1854.

References

1854 births
1942 deaths
English emigrants to New Zealand
19th-century New Zealand journalists
New Zealand horticulturists
New Zealand orchardists
Unsuccessful candidates in the 1899 New Zealand general election
19th-century New Zealand politicians
20th-century New Zealand journalists
New Zealand editors